All Over the Road is the second studio album by American country music artist Easton Corbin. It was released on September 18, 2012, via Mercury Nashville. The album's first single, "Lovin' You Is Fun,"  hit the top 10 on the Billboard Hot Country Songs chart.

The album's track listing was announced on July 17.

The album debuted at No. 2 on Top Country Albums, and No. 11 on Billboard 200, selling 29,000 copies in the United States in its first week.  As of June 2015, the album has sold 177,000 copies in the United States.

Track listing

Personnel
Eddie Bayers – drums
Easton Corbin – lead vocals 
Larry Franklin – fiddle
Paul Franklin – steel guitar
Brent Mason – electric guitar
James Mitchell – electric guitar
Gary Prim – keyboards, piano, Wurlitzer
John Wesley Ryles – background vocals
W. David Smith – bass guitar
Biff Watson – acoustic guitar
Glenn Worf – bass guitar

Chart performance

Weekly charts

Year-end charts

Singles

References

2012 albums
Easton Corbin albums
Mercury Nashville albums
Albums produced by Carson Chamberlain